Side-blotched lizards are lizards of the genus Uta. They are some of the most abundant and commonly observed lizards in the deserts of western North America, known for cycling between three colorized breeding patterns and is best described in the common side-blotched lizard. They commonly grow to 6 inches including the tail, with the males normally being the larger sex. Males often have bright throat colors.

These lizards are prey for many desert species. Snakes, larger lizards, and birds all make formidable predators to side-blotched lizards. Larger lizard species, such as collared, leopard, and spiny lizards, and roadrunners are the main predators. In turn, the side-blotched lizards eat arthropods, such as insects, spiders, and occasionally scorpions.

As a result of their high predation rate, these lizards are very prolific breeders. From April to June, they breed, with the young emerging as early as late May. These inch-long young appear all through the summer, and into September.

The diploid chromosome number in most if not all species is 34, consisting of 12 macro- and 22 microchromosomes.

Sex
Side-blotched lizards are notable for having the highest number of distinct male and female morphs within a species:  three male and two female. They show a diversity of behaviors associated with reproduction, which are often referred to as "alternative reproductive tactics".

Orange-throated males are "ultra-dominant, high testosterone", that establish large territories and control areas that contain multiple females.  Yellow stripe-throated males ("sneakers") do not defend a territory, but cluster on the fringes of orange-throated lizard territories, and mate with the females on those territories while the orange-throat is absent, as the territory to defend is large.  Blue-throated males are less aggressive and guard only one female; they can fend off the yellow stripe-throated males, but cannot withstand attacks by orange-throated males.

Orange-throated females lay many small eggs and are very territorial.  Yellow-throated females lay fewer, larger eggs, and are more tolerant of each other.

This is called the rock paper scissors effect, borrowed from the name of the playground game, because the outcome of the mating success shows that one morph of the lizard takes advantage over another but not over the third.

The orange and blue-throated males can sometimes be seen approaching a human "intruder". One speculation is that he could be giving the female(s) a chance to escape, but whether he is defending the female has not been documented. Another speculation is that he is highly motivated to engage whenever he sees movement on his territory, which he may be interpreting as a possible intruding male, or another female.

Systematics
The systematics and phylogeny of the side-blotched lizards is very confusing, with many local forms and morphs having been described as full species. Following the 1997 review of Upton and Murphy, which included new data from mtDNA cytochrome b and ATPase 6 sequences, the following species can be recognized pending further research:
 Enchanted side-blotched lizard, U. encantadae
 Dead side-blotched lizard, U. lowei
 Isla San Pedro Nolasco lizard, U. nolascensis
 San Pedro side-blotched lizard, U. palmeri
 Isla Santa Catalina side-blotched lizard, U. squamata
 Common side-blotched lizard, U. stansburiana
 Western side-blotched lizard, U. (stansburiana) elegans
 Nevada side-blotched lizard, U. (stansburiana) nevadensis
 Northern side-blotched lizard, U. (stansburiana) stansburiana
 Eastern side-blotched lizard, U. (stansburiana) stejnegeri
 Plateau side-blotched lizard, U. (stansburiana) uniformis
 Swollen-nosed side-blotched lizard, U. tumidarostra

It is also important to note that the side-blotched lizard is different from the common side-blotched lizard.

References

 Collins JT (1991). "Viewpoint: a new taxonomic arrangement for some North American amphibians and reptiles". Herpetological Review 22(2): 42-43. PDF fulltext
 Grismer LL (1994). "Three new species of intertidal side-blotched lizards (Genus Uta) from the Gulf of California, Mexico". Herpetologica 50: 451–474.
 Murphy, Robert W.; Aguirre-León, Gustavo (2002). "The Nonavian Reptiles: Origins and Evolution". pp. 181-220. In: Case, Ted J.; Cody, Martin L.; Ezcurra, Exequiel (editors) (2002). A New Island Biogeography of the Sea of Cortés. New York: Oxford University Press. 690 pp. . PDF fulltext Appendices 2-4
 Oliver JA (1943). "The Status of Uta ornata lateralis Boulenger". Copeia 1943(2): 97-107.  (First page image)
 Pennock, Lewis A.; Tinkle, Donald W.; Shaw, Margery W. (1968). "Chromosome Number in the Lizard Genus Uta (Family Iguanidae)". Chromosoma 24(4): 467-476.  PDF fulltext
 Upton, Darlene E.; Murphy, Robert W. (1997). "Phylogeny of the Side-Blotched Lizards (Phrynosomatidae: Uta) Based on mtDNA Sequences: Support for a Midpeninsular Seaway in Baja California". Mol. Phyl. Evol. 8 (1): 104-113.  PDF fulltext

Uta
Lizards of North America
Reptiles of the United States
Reptiles of Mexico
Lizard genera
Taxa named by Spencer Fullerton Baird
Taxa named by Charles Frédéric Girard